Peter Oundjian (born 21 December 1955) is a Canadian-American violinist and conductor.

Early life
Born in Toronto, Ontario, as the youngest of five children from an Armenian father and English mother, Oundjian also claims Scottish ancestry through his maternal grandfather, a Sanderson, and the MacDonell of Glengarry clan. Oundjian was educated in England, where he began studying the violin at age seven with Manoug Parikian. He attended Charterhouse School in Godalming and continued his studies later with Bela Katona. He then attended the Royal College of Music.

Oundjian subsequently studied at the Juilliard School with Ivan Galamian, Itzhak Perlman, and Dorothy DeLay. While at Juilliard, he minored in conducting, and later received encouragement in his endeavors when he attended a master class from the eminent Austrian conductor Herbert von Karajan.

Career
In 1980, Oundjian won First Prize at the International Violin Competition in Viña del Mar, Chile. Oundjian became the first violinist of the Tokyo String Quartet and held the post for 14 years. A repetitive stress injury forced Oundjian to curtail his instrumental career.  He then shifted his full-time musical focus to conducting.

Oundjian was the Artistic Director of the Nieuw Sinfonietta Amsterdam (now the Amsterdam Sinfonietta) from 1998 to 2003.  He is also the Artistic Advisor and Principal Guest Conductor of the Caramoor International Music Festival. He was also the Principal Guest Conductor of the Colorado Symphony Orchestra for three years.  For four summers, he led The Philadelphia Orchestra's "Absolutely Mozart" Festival.  Oundjian became principal guest conductor and artistic advisor of the Detroit Symphony Orchestra in September 2006.

Oundjian was named music director of the Toronto Symphony Orchestra (TSO) in January 2003, and assumed the post in 2004.  The orchestra had financial problems before the time of Oundjian's appointment, and he contributed to an improvement in the orchestra's situation since the start of his tenure.  The 2005 documentary film Five Days in September: The Rebirth of an Orchestra records the first days of Oundjian's first season as the TSO's music director.  In February 2007, Oundjian extended his contract with the TSO to 2012.  Following a subsequent contract extension through the 2013-2014 season, in April 2013, the TSO further extended his contract through the 2016-2017 season.  Following a further TSO contract extension through the 2017-2018 season, Oundjian concluded his music directorship of the TSO at the close of the 2017-2018 season and was named the TSO's conductor emeritus.  He also received the Key to the City from Toronto mayor John Tory.

Since 1981, Oundjian has taught as an adjunct professor of violin at the Yale School of Music.  In January 2011, the Royal Scottish National Orchestra announced the appointment of Oundjian as its next music director, as of the 2012-2013 season, with an initial contract of 4 years.  He concluded his RSNO tenure at the close of the 2017-2018 season.

In June 2007, Oundjian conducted the world premiere of an oratorio by Eric Idle and John DuPrez based on the Monty Python movie Life of Brian, titled  Not the Messiah (He's a Very Naughty Boy), at the first Luminato Festival in Toronto, Canada.  In January 2019, the Colorado Music Festival announced the appointment of Oundjian as its next music director.

In February 2022, Oundjian was announced as principal conductor of the Colorado Symphony. He conducted his first concert in this new role, a performance of Holst's The Planets, in late March.

Personal life
Oundjian and his wife Nadine have two children. His nephew is hockey player Ben Smith.  He is a cousin to British comedian Eric Idle.

References

External links
 HarrisonParrott agency biography of Oundjian
 Frank Salomon agency biography of Oundjian
 Columbia Artists Management agency biography of Oundjian
 Peter Oundjian, "A note from the RSNO's new Music Director - Peter Oundjian".  Royal Scottish National Orchestra website, 31 January 2011
 Peter Oundjian, entry in Encyclopedia of Music in Canada

1955 births
Alumni of the Royal College of Music
Canadian classical violinists
Male classical violinists
Male conductors (music)
Canadian people of Armenian descent
Juilliard School alumni
Living people
People educated at Charterhouse School
Musicians from Toronto
Yale School of Music faculty
20th-century classical violinists
20th-century Canadian conductors (music)
21st-century Canadian conductors (music)
21st-century classical violinists
20th-century Canadian male musicians
21st-century Canadian male musicians
20th-century Canadian violinists and fiddlers
Canadian male violinists and fiddlers